Rodolfo "Ompong" Galido Plaza (born March 13, 1958) is a Filipino politician. A member of the Nationalist People's Coalition, he has been elected to three terms as a Member of the House of Representatives, representing the Lone District of Agusan del Sur, first in 2001 and most recently in 2007.

Personal life 
He is the son of former governors Democrito O. Plaza and Valentina G. Plaza and brother of former governor Adolph Edward Plaza and governor Maria Valentina Plaza.

References

External links
 

1958 births
Living people
People from Agusan del Sur
Nationalist People's Coalition politicians
Members of the House of Representatives of the Philippines from Agusan del Sur